Mohammad Sahimi is an Iranian footballer who plays for Siah Jamegan Khorasan F.C.

Club career
Sahimi has played for Shahrdari Tabriz since 2009, after joined the on loan from Payam Mashhad F.C.

Club Career Statistics
Last Update  10 September 2010 

 Assist Goals

References

Living people
F.C. Aboomoslem players
Payam Mashhad players
Shahrdari Tabriz players
Iranian footballers
Association football midfielders
Year of birth missing (living people)